Albert Hagar (January 1, 1827 – September 14, 1924) was a Canadian merchant and politician.

Hagar was born in North Plantagenet Township, Upper Canada (now Ontario) in 1827. He was the son of Abner Hagar, a former Montreal merchant, and Hannah P. Barker. He was educated in Vermont and became a farmer, merchant and lumber dealer and owned a sawmill and gristmill at Plantagenet. Hagar was elected to the Canadian House of Commons for the riding of Prescott in 1867. A Liberal, he was acclaimed in 1872 and re-elected in 1874. He was defeated in 1878.

He was elected to the Legislative Assembly of Ontario for the riding of Prescott in an 1881 by-election held after the death of William Harkin. A Liberal, he was re-elected in 1883.

Hagar was also a captain in the local militia, superintendent of schools, reeve for North Plantagenet Township and warden for Prescott and Russell counties. He also served as sheriff for Prescott and Russell counties. Later in life, he was the last surviving member of the first Canadian parliament.

Hagar died in Plantagenet at the age of 97.

References

Further reading
 Histoire des Comtes Unis de Prescott et de Russell, L. Brault (1963)

External links

1827 births
1924 deaths
Liberal Party of Canada MPs
Members of the House of Commons of Canada from Ontario
Ontario Liberal Party MPPs